5-Diphosphomevalonic acid (or mevalonate-5-pyrophosphate, or 5-pyrophosphomevalonate) is an intermediate in the mevalonate pathway.

See also
 Mevalonic acid
 Phosphomevalonate kinase
 Pyrophosphomevalonate decarboxylase

External links
 

Organophosphates
Carboxylic acids